Alitta is a genus of marine annelids in Nereididae family (commonly known as sandworms or ragworms). There are three recognised species within the genus, Alitta grandis (Stimpson, 1853), Alitta succinea (Frey & Leuckart, 1847) and Alitta virens (M. Sars, 1835). Alitta brandti Malmgren, 1865 was originally considered part of the genus, but is now accepted as Neanthes brandti (Malmgren, 1865).

References

Phyllodocida
Polychaete genera